Aves is a surname. Notable people with the surname include:

 Annie Aves (1887–1938), New Zealand abortionist
 Geraldine Aves (1898–1986), British civil servant and UN advisor
 Henry D. Aves (1853—1936), American Episcopal missionary